Tangela Nicole Smith (born April 1, 1977) is a retired American basketball player in the WNBA. Smith played the bulk of her career for the Sacramento Monarchs and the Phoenix Mercury where she won two WNBA Championships. She's currently an assistant coach at Northwestern University.

High school
Born and raised in Chicago, Illinois, Smith attended George Washington High School, where she was named a 1994 Kodak High School All-American. Smith was named a High School All-American by the WBCA. She participated in the WBCA  High School All-America Game in 1994, scoring three points.

College
Smith graduated from the University of Iowa in 1998.  She won the 1998 Big Ten Player of the Year award.  She was also a 1998 Kodak/WBCA All-America honorable mention and earned 1996 and 1998 All-Big Ten first team and 1997 All-Big Ten honorable mention accolades.

USA Basketball
Smith competed with USA Basketball as a member of the 1997 Jones Cup Team that won the silver medal in Taipei. Several of the games were close, with the USA team winning four games by six points or fewer, including an overtime game in the semifinal match against Japan. The gold medal game against South Korea was also close, but the USA fell 76–71 to claim the silver medal for the event. Smith averaged 8.0 points per game.

WNBA career
Smith was selected 12th overall in the 1998 WNBA Draft by the Sacramento Monarchs.  She played 6 seasons for the Monarchs, helping them reach the playoffs five times.  In 2005, she was traded to the Sting in exchange for Nicole Powell. Charlotte folded following the 2006 season and Smith's rights were acquired by the Minnesota Lynx in the dispersal draft.

On Draft Day in April 2007, she was dealt to the Phoenix Mercury for No. 1 overall pick Lindsey Harding.

On Friday, 13 August 2010 she overtook Vickie Johnson and became the WNBA's all-time leader in games played with 411 in 13 seasons. During her time in the league she missed 15 games.

International career
In the WNBA offseason in 1998–99, Smith was a professional basketball player in Italy, Israel, South Korea and Turkey. In 2001, she helped the Botasspor squad win the Turkish league crown.  In 2002, she helped the Shinsegae Coolcats win the Korean league championship. Now she plays in the Hungarian Championship since February 2013, for the 2012 Champion Team, HAT-AGRO UNI Győr.

Coaching career
Tangela Smith began her coaching career in 2014 at Western Michigan University on Shane Clipfell's staff. As an assistant coach, Smith helped WMU to a 74–56 record over four seasons.

On July 6, 2018, it was announced that Smith was hired as an assistant coach and would join Joe McKeown's staff at Northwestern University. This would mark a return to the Big 10 where she played collegiately.

References

External links
Western Michigan Broncos coaching bio
WNBA Player Profile
U.S Basketball Bio
Official Tangela Smith Website

1977 births
Living people
American expatriate basketball people in China
American expatriate basketball people in Italy
American expatriate basketball people in Turkey
American women's basketball players
Basketball coaches from Illinois
Basketball players from Chicago
Botaş SK players
Charlotte Sting players
Galatasaray S.K. (women's basketball) players
Indiana Fever players
Iowa Hawkeyes women's basketball players
Liaoning Flying Eagles players
Parade High School All-Americans (girls' basketball)
Phoenix Mercury players
Power forwards (basketball)
Sacramento Monarchs players
San Antonio Stars players
Sportspeople from Chicago
Western Michigan Broncos women's basketball coaches
Women's National Basketball Association All-Stars